Natalie Ann Pluskota (born November 2, 1989) is an American former tennis player.

In her career, Pluskota won four doubles titles on the ITF Women's Circuit. On July 8, 2013, she reached her best singles ranking of world No. 478. On September 16, 2013, she peaked at No. 157 in the WTA doubles rankings.

In February 2016, Pluskota announced her retirement via Facebook.

ITF finals

Singles (0–1)

Doubles (4–5)

References

External links

 
 

1989 births
Living people
People from Newnan, Georgia
Sportspeople from the Atlanta metropolitan area
Tennis people from Georgia (U.S. state)
American female tennis players
Tennessee Volunteers women's tennis players